Jean-Baptiste Paul Lazerges ( 10 January 1845, Paris — 21 May 1902, Asnières-sur-Seine) was a French painter. He studied with his father, Hippolyte Lazerges. His 1880 portrait of Sarah Bernhardt was particularly noted.

References

1845 births
1902 deaths
19th-century French painters
French male painters
20th-century French painters
20th-century French male artists
Painters from Paris
19th-century French male artists